Roy Hamilton Scott (6 May 1917 – 5 August 2005) was a New Zealand cricketer who played in one Test in 1947.

Cricket career
Scott was a middle-order right-handed batsman and a medium-pace bowler who played first-class cricket for Canterbury from 1940–41 to 1954–55. He had a good Plunket Shield season in 1946–47, making 86 against Otago and 85 against Auckland and taking 6 for 99 against Wellington in the three matches.

His single Test came at the end of that season when New Zealand played one Test against England led by Wally Hammond. The match was ruined by rain; Scott scored 18 batting at number eight and, opening the bowling with Jack Cowie, took one wicket, that of Bill Edrich.

He was picked for the trial match for the 1949 New Zealand tour of England but, despite top-scoring in the New Zealand XI's second innings and taking four wickets, he was not picked for the tour, and retired after the match, re-emerging for one more first-class match in 1953-54 and a final one in 1954–55.

See also
 One-Test wonder

References

External links

1917 births
2005 deaths
New Zealand Test cricketers
New Zealand cricketers
Canterbury cricketers
South Island Army cricketers
South Island cricketers
New Zealand Services cricketers